Neblaboumbou is a town in the Gaongo Department of Bazèga Province in central Burkina Faso. The town has a population of 1,635.

References

Populated places in the Centre-Sud Region
Bazèga Province